Mohammad Kazemi is an Iranian intelligence officer and brigadier general in the Islamic Revolutionary Guard Corps (IRGC) who currently heads the IRGC's Intelligence Organization, replacing Hossein Taeb in 2022. He previously headed the IRGC's Intelligence Protection Organization, a counter-intelligence agency.

References 

Living people

Year of birth missing (living people)
Directors of intelligence agencies

Islamic Revolutionary Guard Corps brigadier generals